Menali River is a right bank tributary of Banas River. It joins Banas along with Berach River  near Mandalgarh, forming a Triveni Sangam

Rivers of Rajasthan
Rivers of India